Kirill Anatolyevich Zaika (born 7 October 1992) is a Russian professional football player who plays as wide midfielder (on left or right) for PFC Sochi. He also played as left-back and right-back.

Club career
He made his Russian Football National League debut for FC Khimki on 11 July 2016 in a game against FC Tosno. He made his Russian Premier League debut for PFC Sochi on 1 March 2020 in a game against FC Arsenal Tula, as a starter.

International career
Zaika was called up to the Russia national football team for the first time for a training camp in March 2022, at the time of Russia's suspension from international football.

Personal life
His wife Anna Cholovyaga is a former player for the Russia women's national football team.

Career statistics

References

External links
 
 
 

1992 births
People from Uspensky District
Sportspeople from Krasnodar Krai
Living people
Russian footballers
Association football midfielders
FC Rostov players
FC Taganrog players
FC Khimki players
PFC Sochi players
Russian Premier League players
Russian First League players
Russian Second League players